Slyne-with-Hest is a civil parish in the City of Lancaster in Lancashire, England.  It had a population of 3,163 recorded in the 2001 census, decreasing to 3,126 at the 2011 Census. The parish is north of Lancaster and consists of two villages; Slyne, on the A6 road, and Hest Bank on the coast.

History
Hest Bank (
) is a village in north-western Lancashire, England, the boundaries of which include the coastline, from a western shoreline of salt-flats that adjoin the northern extremities of Morecambe's Victorian era Promenade, to a less clearly defined boundary in the east with the village of Slyne, which dates from Anglo-Saxon times.

Notable buildings and roads
Hest Bank's best-known building, 'The Hest Bank Hotel' (previously named the Sands Inn), is itself hundreds of years old, and once served as a coaching station for traffic crossing the sands of what is now called Morecambe Bay.  Ordnance Survey Maps still show the right-of-way across Morecambe Bay from Hest Bank to Grange-over-Sands, and many walkers enjoy guided walks across the bay, which take place from Spring to Autumn, normally every other weekend, tides allowing.  The right-of-way is not suitable for normal motor vehicles, there being water at around knee-height to cross at the outflow from the River Kent.

Governance
An electoral ward of the same name exists. This ward extends beyond the confines of the parish and has a population taken at the 2011 Census of 4,119.

Before Brexit for the European Parliament residents in Slyne-with-Hest voted to elect MEPs for the North West England constituency.

Railway line
In 1965 this originally coastal village was the scene of a rail accident on 20 May, when a sleeper train from London Euston bound for Glasgow Central left the rails at 70 mph and collided with the Hest Bank station buildings.  No one was seriously injured, although from that time Hest Bank has ceased to serve as a passenger station, its railside platform consequently now lying buried in undergrowth.

Community
The village has a primary school: St Lukes Slyne-with-Hest; and tennis, football and bowling clubs.

Notable people
 Tyson Fury, boxer
 Dame Thora Hird, actress 
 Helen Pidd, journalist

See also

Listed buildings in Slyne-with-Hest

References

External links

 Cross Bay Run to Hest Bank by Keith Wilkinson (reporter)
ITV Local report on Cross Bay Run to Hest Bank

Civil parishes in Lancashire
Geography of the City of Lancaster
Populated coastal places in Lancashire